Eulamprus is a genus of lizards, commonly known as water skinks, in the subfamily Sphenomorphinae of the family Scincidae. The genus is native to Australia.

Taxonomy
The genus Eulamprus belongs to a clade in the Sphenomorphus group that contains other genera such as Ctenotus and Anomalopus. The molecular phylogenetic studies of O'Connor and Moritz (2003) and Skinner et al. (2013) found that species assigned to Eulamprus comprised four independent lineages within the Australian Sphenomorphus group and did not form a clade. The genus Eulamprus was restricted to the water skinks, with other species assigned to Concinnia (including species formerly in the monotypic genera Gnypetoscincus and Nangura), Silvascincus and Tumbunascincus.

Species
The following five species are recognized as being valid.
Eulamprus heatwolei Wells & Wellington, 1983 – warm-temperate water-skink, Heatwole's water skink
Eulamprus kosciuskoi Kinghorn, 1932 – alpine meadow-skink, alpine water skink
Eulamprus leuraensis Wells & Wellington, 1983 – Blue Mountains water skink, Blue Mountain swamp-skink
Eulamprus quoyii Quoy & Gaimard, 1824 – golden water skink, eastern water-skink, eastern water skink
Eulamprus tympanum (Lönnberg & Andersson, 1915) – southern water skink, cool-temperate water-skink, highland water skink, Dreeite water skink

Species formerly placed in Eulamprus
Concinnia ampla (Covacevich & McDonald, 1980) – lemon-barred forest-skink
Concinnia brachyosoma (Lönnberg & Andersson, 1915) – northern barsided skink
Concinnia frerei (Greer, 1992) – stout barsided skink
Concinnia martini Wells & Wellington, 1983 – dark barsided skink
Concinnia sokosoma (Greer, 1992) – stout barsided skink
Concinnia tenuis (Gray, 1831) bar-sided forest-skink, barred-sided skink
Concinnia tigrina (De Vis, 1888) – yellow-blotched forest-skink, rainforest water-skink
Silvascincus murrayi (Boulenger, 1887) – blue-speckled forest-skink
Silvascincus tryoni (Longman, 1918) – Border Ranges blue-spectacled skink, forest skink, Tryon's skink
Tumbunascincus luteilateralis (Covacevich & McDonald, 1980) – orange-speckled forest-skink

References

Further reading

 (2006). Using ancient and recent DNA to explore relationships of extinct and endangered Leiolopisma skinks (Reptilia: Scincidae) in the Mascarene islands. Molecular Phylogenetics and Evolution 39 (2): 503–511.  (HTML abstract).
 (1843). Systema Reptilium, Fasciculus Primus, Amblyglossae. Vienna: Braumüller & Seidel. 106 pp. + indices. (Eulamprus, new genus, p. 22). (in Latin).
 (2008). A replacement name for Sphenomorphus keiensis (Kopstein, 1926) from the southeastern Moluccas, Indonesia (Reptilia: Squamata: Scincidae) with a redescription of the species. Zoologische Mededelingen Leiden 82 (52): 737–747. PDF.

 
Lizard genera
Taxa named by Leopold Fitzinger
Skinks of Australia